Pyralis regalis is a species of snout moth. It is found from most of Europe (except Ireland, Great Britain, Portugal, the Benelux, Germany and Norway) east to Asia, including China, Cambodia, Myanmar, India, Russia, Korea, Japan and Taiwan.

The wingspan is 16–20 mm. Adults are on wing from June to September.

Larvae have been recorded in a wasp honeycomb in Japan.

References

Moths described in 1775
Pyralini
Moths of Japan
Moths of Europe
Moths of Asia